Vernone Lamme (1892 - 1979) was a writer and editor in Florida. He served as Florida's first state archaeologist. He wrote for Florida newspapers, was an amateur archaeologist and became an official overseeing archaeological excavations. Later in his life he authored books including Floridian lore.

He moved to Florida with his father in 1912.

After drafting legislation to establish a state archaeologist, he was appointed to the position by governor David Sholtz on June 10, 1935. He oversaw the excavation of various sites.

His actions drew controversy and critics called him a charlatan and accused him of corruption. He was dismissed from his position after several months, but was later reinstated and served until he resigned.

He was an alderman of the Marineland community and served as a government official.

Vernon ad Louise Lamme copyrighted a 62 page publication on Florida minstrel Stephen Foster with illustrations by Bob Lamme.

Work
More Florida Lore Not Found in History Books (1973), a compilation of his columns and stories

References

20th-century American archaeologists
1892 births
1979 deaths